The Exorcist steps are concrete stairs, continuing 36th Street, descending from the corner of Prospect St and 36th St NW, down to a small parking lot, set back from the intersection of M Street NW, Canal Rd NW, and Whitehurst Freeway NW in the Georgetown neighborhood of Washington, D.C., famous for being featured in the 1973 film The Exorcist. The steps were built in 1895 during construction of the adjacent Capital Traction Company Barn for cable cars, serving as a lightwell and public right of way. Before the Exorcist association, the stairs were informally called "Hitchcock steps" for famed suspense and horror film director Alfred Hitchcock.

For The Exorcist, the steps were padded with half-inch-thick rubber to film the fall of the character Father Damien Karras. Because the house from which Karras falls was set back slightly from the steps, the film crew constructed an eastward extension with a false front to the house in order to film the scene.

In a ceremonial Halloween weekend in 2015 that featured the film's director William Friedkin and screenwriter William Peter Blatty (who also wrote the book on which the film is based), the Exorcist steps were recognized as a D.C. landmark and official tourist attraction by Mayor of the District of Columbia Muriel Bowser, with a plaque unveiled at the base of the steps recognizing its importance to Washington, D.C. and film history.

See also 
 Potemkin Stairs
 Rocky Steps
 Joker Stairs
 The Music Box Steps

References

External links

Washington Post review of the steps

The Exorcist
Georgetown (Washington, D.C.)
Stairways in the United States
Transportation in Washington, D.C.